Mothers & Daughters may refer to:

Mothers and Daughters (book), a book by Prof. Mildred Blaxter and Elizabeth Patterson
 Mothers and Daughters (comics), a four-volume graphic novel by Dave Sim featuring Cerebus the Aardvark
 Mothers and Daughters (2016 film), a 2016 comedy film
 Mothers & Daughters (2008 film), a Canadian comedy-drama film
 Mothers & Daughters (2004 film), a 2004 independent film directed by Hannah Davis and David Conolly
 Mothers & Daughters (album), a 1997 studio album by Rosemary Clooney
 Mothers and Daughters, an 1831 novel by Catherine Gore